7ºCN (stylized 7℃N) is the seventh mini-album by South Korean pop-rock idol band CNBLUE. It was released on March 20, 2017, under FNC Entertainment and distributed by LOEN Entertainment. It was also the last Korean release to feature Jonghyun, who left the group in August 2019.

Following a series of photo and video teasers, 7ºCN and its lead single "Between Us" were concurrently released. CNBLUE began promoting the record through music chart programs across various television networks by performing the single and other album tracks. The mini-album peaked at number two on South Korea's national Gaon Album Chart, selling over 47,000 copies since its release. The quartet is set to embark on the 2017 CNBLUE Live: Between Us concert tour, a series of shows to take place throughout Asia.

Background
On February 14, 2016, it was announced that CNBLUE was scheduled to release an album the following month. A tentative release date of March 20 was initially reported, but a definitive date had not yet been confirmed. The release date was later confirmed.

The title 7ºCN signifies "the story of 'emotions' CNBLUE has felt over the seven years since debut, the varied temperatures of one's feelings in life were welded into music." Recording and mixing for the mini-album took place in Seoul at the FNC Entertainment Studio; it was mastered at the JFS Mastering Studio.

Music structure
A pop-rock record, CNBLUE reimplements components of electronic music into 7°CN as  it previously did in its second studio album 2gether (2015). The mini-album explores the themes of "encounters, love, memories, and reality" in its lyrics. "Between Us" is a pop-rock song which conveys the "ambiguous and confusing feelings" leading up to start of a relationship. A pop number accompanied with "brassy funk", "It's You" describes the feelings a man experiences as a result of falling in love. The band showcases a more conventional sound in "Calling You", which sees the narrator "directly approach his love interest". "When I Was Young" is an electronic rock track which delves into reminiscence of the innocence of childhood. A second song harping on CNBLUE's roots, "Manito" an acoustic track which deals with the grief of "unrequited love". Previously included in the band's Japanese album Euphoria, "Royal Rumble" is a "polyrhythmic electronic-acoustic hybrid".

Artwork concept and packaging
7°CN was released in two editions: version A and special. The former comes encased in a sleeve case and hard cover, while the latter is in a paper slipcase. They include a 72-page and 24-page booklet, respectively; both include one random postcard and photocard selfie, as well as a poster.

Released on March 27, the artwork for the special edition of 7°CN was designed by Argentinean graphic designer Pilar Zeta. Revolving around the concept of "confusion and [complication]", the cover art depicts portals between a surreal "magical world" filled with stars and pyramids, and a colorful door which "represents the infinite possibilities that there are in the field". It also shows a male figure viewing the door into the other world. The portals indicate how "that contrast opens, this, relationship in between these two worlds". Zeta cited "Between Us" as a vital inspiration for the album artwork.

Release and promotion
On March 13, launching films for each member, as well as a poster for the lead single "Between Us", were released. The following day, "#On" photos of the group and each individual member were unveiled. This was subsequently followed by "#Off" images the day after. A music video teaser for "Between Us" was uploaded on March 16, followed by a highlight medley on the following day. On March 18, a band performance trailer for the lead single was released. Lyric posters of Jung Yong-hwa and Kang Min-hyuk were released on social media websites that same day, as well as lyric posters of Lee Jong-hyun and Lee Jung-shin the subsequent day.

7°CN and the music video for "Between Us" was simultaneously released on March 20. On March 23, CNBLUE began promoting "Between Us" by performing the song on weekly music chart shows. In addition to the lead single, the band also performed "It's You" on Mnet's M Countdown and Korean Broadcasting System's (KBS) Music Bank, and "When I Was Young" Munhwa Broadcasting Corporation's (MBC) Show! Music Core and Seoul Broadcasting System's (SBS) Inkigayo. CNBLUE also performed on SBS MTV's The Show and MBC Music's Show Champion.

In order to promote the record, the band will embark on the 2017 CNBLUE Live: Between Us concert tour. It is the band's first tour since promoting 2gether through the 2015 CNBLUE Live: Come Together tour. The initial pair of shows will take place between June 3–4 at the SK Olympic Handball Gymnasium in Seoul. From July to September, CNBLUE will make stops in Singapore, Manila, Jakarta, Bangkok, Hong Kong, and Taipei.

Critical reception
Writing for online magazine IZM, Jung Min-jae rated 7ºCN three out of five stars, noting that CNBLUE's musical progress had developed rapidly upon the band "[overtaking] the helm". He observed that the quartet "produce much slicker materials in terms of melody progression, sound structure, and performance" and the "melodies, arrangements, vocals, and instrumentals fit together to a tee", asserting that the band is "now entering the stage of building its own realm". However, he expressed that CNBLUE's mini-albums "tend to have similar tinges", citing the repetitiveness of the "composing styles and themes of title-tracks, as well as repetition of patterned b-sides give listeners a feeling of déjà vu". He felt that the record was "quite an uneventful series of listens" in spite of its quality. Billboard magazine columnist Tamar Herman labeled it "one of [CNBLUE's] most innovative album in years". With its "genre-blending tracks", she noted that the record was able to "showcase the group's ability to combine rock music with K-pop's experiment nature".

7°CN earned the band a nomination for the Golden Disc Album Award at the 32nd Golden Disc Awards.

Commercial performance
On the chart dated March 19–25, 2017, 7ºCN debuted at number three on South Korea's national Gaon Album Chart. In its second week, the mini-album rose to its peak at number two. By the end of 2017, it sold 53,559 copies domestically. The mini-album ranked at number eight on Billboard magazine's World Albums Chart. In Japan, the mini-album debuted at number 33 on the weekly Oricon Albums Chart, selling 2,972 copies in its first week. It spent a second consecutive week at its peak, selling an additional 2,549 copies. It has sold 7,408 copies in the country since its release.

Track listing

Personnel
Credits adapted from the album's liner notes.

 CNBLUE – background vocals
 Jung Yong-hwa – record producer, lyricist, composer, guitar
 Kang Min-hyuk – drums
 Lee Jong-hyun – guitar, lyricist, composer, arranger
 Lee Jung-shin – bass, lyricist, composer
 Bae Hun-jik – recording engineer
 Choi Eun-jeong – artist management
 Choi Jin-ho – arranger
 Choi Yu-jin – contents planning, marketing
 Choi Yun-jin – A&R, publishing
 Han Seong-ho – executive producer
 Han Seung-hoon – producer, composer
 Hong Ji-su – artist management
 Im Ji-yeon – A&R, media planning
 Jang Ae-ri – media planning
 Jang Bit-na – assistant stylist
 Jeon Geun-hwa – background vocals
 Jo Se-hee – arranger, piano
 Jo Seong-wan – supervisor
 Jung Bo-yeong – makeup
 Jung Eun-bi – international business
 Jung Eun-gyeong – customer relationship management
 Jung Go-eun – customer relationship management
 Jung Jae-pil – guitar
 Jung Yu-jin – customer relationship management
 Justin Reinstein – lyricist, composer, arranger
 Kang Jong-hyeok – artist management
 Kim Chang-rak – producer, composer, arranger
 Kim Hang-a – design
 Kim Hye-rim – artist management
 Kim I-na – lyricist
 Kim Jae-ho – A&R
 Kim Jae-yang – producer
 Kim Ji-hye – contents planning, marketing
 Kim Ji-yu – customer relationship management
 Kim Ji-yun – design
 Kim Na-yeon – visual communication
 Kim Seong-han – contents planning, marketing
 Kim Tae-hyeok – artist management
 Kim Yeong-seon – contents planning, marketing

 Kim Yong-seup – media planning
 Kim Yong-won – artist management
 Kim Yu-jin – customer relationship management, design
 Ko Jin-young – composer, arranger, bass
 Kwon Nam-woo – mastering engineer
 Kwon Woo-mi – A&R
 Lee Ga-yeong – international business
 Lee Hae-yeong – publishing
 Lee Hye-yeong – stylist
 Lee Ji-yeong – media planning
 Lee Jeong-woo – bass
 Lee Seung-ho – artist management
 Lee Yu-jin – mixing engineer
 Lin Won – international business
 Ma Se-bin – international business
 miwa – lyricist
 Mok Jeong-wook – photography
 No Hyeong-gyu – artist management
 Noriyuki Inoue (Jizue) – arranger
 Oh Ji-eun – customer relationship management
 Park Jeong-min – recording engineer, mixing engineer
 Park Mi-hyeong – hair
 Park Sang-hyeon – artist management
 Pilar Zeta – art direction, design
 Pyo Jin-hee – customer relationship management
 Ryu Min-a – MCs
 Seo Seok-bin – visual communication
 Seon Se-mi – contents planning, marketing
 Seong Jong-jin – artist management
 Seong Sang-hyeon – international business
 Song Yun-ho – MCs
 Shim Hye-jin – contents planning, marketing
 Woo Hyeon-sik – artist management
 Yang Hee-won – artist management
 Yeo Hwan-gu – artist management
 Yoo Seong-yeong – international business
 Yoo Sun-ho – media planning
 Yoon Hye-jin – design
 Yoon Je-yun – artist management

Charts

Sales

Release history

References

External links

2017 EPs
Albums produced by Jung Yong-hwa
CNBLUE EPs
FNC Entertainment EPs
Korean-language EPs
Kakao M EPs
Pop rock EPs